Derroll Adams (November 27, 1925 – February 6, 2000) was an American folk musician.

Biography
He was born Derroll Lewis Thompson in Portland, Oregon, United States. At 16, he served in the Army, but was discharged when his true age of 16 was discovered, and later in the Coast Guard. He was a tall, lanky banjo player with a deep voice. He was busking around the West Coast music scene in the 1950s when he met Ramblin' Jack Elliott in the Topanga Canyon area of Los Angeles. The two traveled around and recorded albums, among them Cowboys and The Rambling Boys.

His recording career was somewhat uneven, and like Elliott he was better known for whom he influenced—Donovan, among others—than for his own art. With Elliott, he had gone to England to play live and record. Elliott went back, but Adams stayed. He took Donovan, who had been playing around the UK with Gypsy Dave, under his wing as a sort of protégé; as a result, the influence of American traditional music can be distinctly heard in Donovan's earlier work, including the song "Epistle To Derroll".

In celebration of Adams 65th birthday, a concert featuring Allan Taylor, Wizz Jones, former members of Pentangle and Happy Traum, plus Adams former travelling partner Elliott, was recorded and released on album.

Adams died in Antwerp, Belgium, in February 2000. His collaboration with Elliott left behind a body of influence that prevails today. Topic Records has made most of his and Elliott's recordings available on CD.

Discography
Solo projects
1967: Portland Town
1972: Feelin' Fine
1974: Movin' On
1977: Along the Way
1978: Folk Friends, double LP recorded in Germany with Davey Arthur, Alex Campbell, Guy & Candie Carawan, Finbar Furey (The Fureys), Wizz Jones, Werner Lämmerhirt and Hannes Wader.
1994: Derroll Adams LIVE
1997: Songs of the Banjoman
2002: Banjoman – a tribute to Derroll Adams, Blue Groove BG-1420
2016: Live in Haarlem 1977, SCR-78 StrictlyCountryRecords.com.

With Ramblin' Jack Elliott
1957: The Rambling Boys
1963: Roll On Buddy
1969: Folkland Songs
1969: Riding in Folkland
1975: America

References

Sources
Williams, Paul: Bob Dylan Performing Artist vols. 1–3 (a.k.a. The Early Years, The Middle Years and Mind Out of Time, respectively)
Pennebaker, D. A.: Dont Look Back
Donovan: Troubadour: The Definitive Collection 1964–1976
Folk Freak Plattenproduktion Folk Friends 1978

External links
Banjoman: A Tribute to Derroll Adams (2002 album)

American folk singers
American street performers
Musicians from Portland, Oregon
1925 births
2000 deaths
20th-century American singers
Singers from Oregon